The People's Reform Party (abbrev. PRP) is a political party in the Philippines. Founded on April 12, 1991, as the political party of former Agrarian Reform Secretary Miriam Defensor Santiago for her bid as president in the 1992 Presidential Elections. During the 1992 Elections, the party nominated Santiago as president and Ramon Magsaysay, Jr. as vice president, however both Santiago and Magsaysay lost the elections to former Defense Secretary Fidel Ramos and then-Senator Joseph Estrada, respectively. The Force of Reform Philippines (FORPH) serves as the official youth-wing of the People's Reform Party. While under the same Miriam Defensor Santiago wing, the Youth Reform Movement is not related to the PRP.

1992 General Election

These are the following members who ran under the People's Reform Party for the following positions:

 Presidential Election
 President: Miriam Defensor Santiago
 Vice President: Ramon Magsaysay, Jr.
 Senatorial Election
 Fortunato Abat
 Cris Abasolo
 Carlos Cajelo
 Dominico Casas
 Jose Cordova
 Dante de Guzman
 Renato Ecarma
 Melchor Ines
 Antonio Leviste
 Abdullah Abe Madale
 Jaime Muyargas
 Antonio Policarpio
 Mario Reyes
 Blue Rivera
 Efren Sumajit
 Albert Umali
 Local Election: The following politicians won under the People's Reform Party during the 1992 general elections in the Philippines:
 Manila
 Mayor: Alfredo Lim
 Vice Mayor: Lito Atienza
 Baguio City
 Mayor: Mauricio Domogan
 Caloocan
 Mayor: Rey Malonzo
 Vice Mayor:
 San Mateo, Rizal
 Mayor: Jose Peping Diaz
 Vice Mayor: Ike Rodriguez
 Councilor: Rodolfo John Ortiz Teope

1995 General Election

The following run under the banner of People's Reform Party in the 1995 election:
 Senatorial Election 
 Miriam Defensor Santiago (won)
 Herman Tiu Laurel (lost)
 Brigido Simon (withdraw and slide to run for Mayor of Quezon City)

 Congressional Election
Reynaldo Calalay - First District, Quezon City
Leopolddo San Buenaventura - Camarines Sur
Narciso Monfort - Iloilo
Prospero Nograles - Davao City
Dabs Abdullah Mangotara - Lanao del Norte

 Board Members
 Albay
Andres Serrano
 Biliran
Romulo Bernardes
 Local Election
 Manila
 Mayor: Alfredo Lim
 Vice Mayor: Lito Atienza
 Councilors:
Banzai Nieva
Berting Ocampo
Toting Cailian
Erning Dionisio
Nesto Ponce
Bert Basco
Marlon Lacson
Joe Lopez
Pete de Jesus
Nilo Roces
Vic Melendez
Rino Tolentino
Paz Herrera
Edward Maceda
Rudy Bacani
Joey Hizon
Felix Espiritu
Rogie dela Paz
Kim Atienza
Roger Gernale
Ging Logarta
Lou Veloso
Joy Dawis
Butch Belgica
 

 Catbalogan City
 Mayor: Jess Redaja
 Padre Garcia, Batangas
 Mayor: Victor Reyes
 Mandaluyong
 Vice Mayor: Ernesto Domingo
 Biñan, Laguna
 Vice Mayor: Alexis Desuasido
 Sta. Rosa, Laguna
 Vice Mayor: Jose Catindig
 Baguio City
 Councilors:
Elmo Nevada
Edilberto Claraval
Richard Carino
Rolando dela Cruz
Lilia Yaranon

 Bamban, Tarlac
 Councilors:
Ricarte Rivera

 Norzagaray, Bulacan
 Councilors:
Mario Villegas

1998 General ElectionCandidates Presidential Election
 President: Miriam Defensor Santiago
 Vice President: Francisco Tatad
 Senatorial Election
(none)

2001 General Election

 Senatorial Election
The leader Miriam Defensor Santiago and her PRP joined the Puwersa ng Masa coalition of the opposition ticket under deposed President Joseph Estrada.

2004 General Election

 Senatorial Election
The leader Miriam Defensor Santiago and her PRP joined the K-4 coalition of the administration ticket under Gloria Macapagal Arroyo.

2010 General Election

 Senatorial Election
People's Reform Party leader Miriam Defensor Santiago was invited by Nacionalista Party standard bearer Manuel "Manny" Villar, Jr. as one of his senatorial guest candidates. PRP was also in coalition with two other parties, Lakas-Kampi CMD and Partido ng Masang Pilipino on the senatorial election. Mike Defensor ran under People's Reform Party in the Quezon City mayoralty race but lost the polls. Arthur Defensor, Sr. ran for the governorship of Iloilo and won the polls, he also caucuses with the Nacionalista Party and Lakas-Kampi-CMD.

2016 General Election

On October 13, 2015, Senator Miriam Defensor Santiago announced her intention to run for president in the 2016 elections. She also announced Bongbong Marcos as her running mate for vice president.http://www.abs-cbnnews.com/nation/10/15/15/miriam-confirms-bongbong-her-vp Candidates Presidential Election
 President: Miriam Defensor Santiago (Lost)
 Vice President: Bongbong Marcos (Lost)
 Senatorial Election
 Greco Belgica (Lost)
 Martin Romualdez (Lost)
 Dionisio Santiago (Lost)
 Francis Tolentino (Lost)
 Local Election - Pasay 
 City Councilor - District 2: Ramon Yabut (Lost)

 2019 General Election
Miriam Defensor Santiago died September 29, 2016 at St. Luke's Medical Center in Taguig from lung cancer. Though the party exists for the political career of Mrs. Santiago, it agreed through Santiago's widow, Narciso Jr. to nominate Harry Roque as candidate for the Philippine Senate. Roque's nomination was arranged through the auspices of Davao City mayor Sara Duterte,  daughter of President Rodrigo Duterte. The nomination of Roque sparked wide criticism, garnering massive backlash notably from stern supporters of the late senator and PRP founder Miriam Defensor Santiago. Various organizations called Roque a 'user' and was 'destroying the image' of PRP and the late Miriam Santiago. Additionally, Roque's already low public appeal degraded further from 8.7% in March 2018 into 8% in October 2018.

The following run under the banner of People's Reform Party in the 2019 election:

 Congressional ElectionMaricel Natividad-Nagaño - Fourth District, Nueva Ecija (won)

 2022 General Election 
The People's Reform Party, now under Narciso Jr., announced support for Sara Duterte's potential presidential run and renewed their ties with the Hugpong ng Pagbabago alliance.

The following run under the Banner of PRP for 2022 elections:

 Senatorial Slate'''
Harry Roque - Former Presidential Spokesperson (Lost)
Gibo Teodoro - Former Secretary of National Defense (Lost)

Electoral performance

Presidential and vice presidential elections

Legislative elections

Notable Party Members
 Sen. Miriam Defensor Santiago
 Sec. Esperanza Cabral (DOH)
 Mike Defensor
 Arthur Defensor, Sr.
 Harry Roque
 Gilbert Teodoro

References

Political parties established in 1991
1991 establishments in the Philippines